Pierre-Gérard Carrier-Belleuse (28 January 1851 in Paris – 29 January 1932 in Paris) was a French painter.

Biography 
His first studies were with his father, the sculptor Albert-Ernest Carrier-Belleuse. Later he studied with Alexandre Cabanel and Pierre Victor Galland at the École des Beaux-Arts.

He exhibited at the Salon in 1875 and won a silver medal at the Exposition Universelle (1889). He also produced drawings and lithographs for Le Figaro Illustré.

Best known for his ballet scenes and pastels, he also did landscapes, portraits and genre works. Most of his paintings are in private collections.

Between 1914 and 1916, he and  proposed, planned and supervised the creation of the Panthéon de la Guerre, which was the world's largest painting (45 ft. high and 402 ft. in circumference) containing almost 5,000 portraits of notable French and Allied wartime figures, mostly sketched from life. Twenty artists played a major role in its production, although many more made contributions. It was exhibited in a specially constructed display building (which was demolished in 1960) next to the Hôtel des Invalides. Later, it made its way to the United States, and reconfigured portions of it may now be seen in the National World War I Museum at  the Liberty Memorial in Kansas City. It was his second such work, following the much smaller Panorama de Notre-Dame de Lourdes from 1881.

The painter Louis-Robert Carrier-Belleuse was Carrier-Belleuse's brother.

Selected paintings

References

Further reading
 Mark Levitch: Panthéon De La Guerre: Reconfiguring a Panorama of the Great War, University of Missouri Press (2006)

External links

 Short biography and photograph from Nos peintres et sculpteurs, graveurs, dessinateurs..., Sociétés de Beaux-Arts, (1897) @ Open Library
 Arcadja: More works by Carrier-Belleuse

1851 births
1932 deaths
19th-century French painters
French male painters
Painters from Paris
Academic staff of the Académie Julian
20th-century French painters
20th-century French male artists
19th-century French male artists